Jürg Neuenschwander (14 January 1947 – 23 March 2014) was a Swiss organist and musician. He was best known for his work with Schweizer Radio DRS from 1982 to 1989. He was born in Eggiwil, canton of Bern.

Neuenschwander died from a cerebral hemorrhage on 23 March 2014 in Bern. He was 67 years old.

References

External links
 

1947 births
2014 deaths
Swiss male composers
Swiss organists
Male organists
20th-century Swiss musicians
People from the canton of Bern
20th-century male musicians